The Southern Cassadaga Spiritualist Camp Historic District (also known as the town of Cassadaga) is a U.S. historic district (designated as such on March 14, 1991) located in Cassadaga, Florida. The district is bounded by Cassadaga Road and Marion, Stevens, Lake and Chauncey Streets. It contains 65 historic buildings and 2 objects.

References

External links

 Volusia County listings at National Register of Historic Places
 Cassadaga Spiritualist Camp
 "Visiting The Psychic Capital Of The World", Bill Geist, CBS Sunday Morning, December 30, 2007.

Gallery

National Register of Historic Places in Volusia County, Florida
Historic districts on the National Register of Historic Places in Florida